Richard "Cody" Bragg (born June 26, 1980 in San Antonio, Texas) is an American soccer player, currently without a club.

Career

College
Bragg grew up in Plano, Texas, played club soccer for the Dallas Texans and in the Dallas Cup in the U19 Super Group, and went on to play college soccer at The Citadel from 2000 to 2003. During his college years he also played with the Texas Spurs in the USL Premier Development League.

Professional
Bragg turned professional in 2004 when he signed with the Pittsburgh Riverhounds, and made over 30 appearances for the team in the USL Second Division. He took a year out of the pro-game in 2007 when the Riverhounds also went on hiatus, and returned to competition when the Riverhounds returned to USL2 in 2008.

References

External links
Riverhounds bio
Infosport Combine info

1980 births
Living people
American soccer players
The Citadel Bulldogs men's soccer players
Pittsburgh Riverhounds SC players
DFW Tornados players
USL League Two players
USL Second Division players
Association football defenders